Minnesota State Highway 269 (MN 269) is a short  highway in southwest Minnesota, which runs from South Dakota Highway 11 (SD 11) at the South Dakota state line to an intersection with State Highway 23 (MN 23) in the city of Jasper.

Route description
Highway 269 begins at the South Dakota state line as a continuation of SD 11. It runs in rural southwest Minnesota along the Rock–Pipestone county line for most of its length. The highway juts slightly north into Pipestone County after entering the city of Jasper. It ends at an intersection with MN 23, known as Railroad Avenue, in the southern part of Jasper. Highway 269 follows West Wall Street in Jasper, and is also known as 1st Street within Pipestone County.

The route is legally defined as Route 269 in the Minnesota Statutes. No part of the highway is included in the National Highway System, a system of highways important to the nation's defense, economy, and mobility.

History
Highway 269 was authorized on July 1, 1949. The road was paved at the time the route was designated. The highway has remained the same since it was designated.

Major intersections

References

External links
Highway 269 at the Unofficial Minnesota Highways Page

269
Transportation in Rock County, Minnesota
Transportation in Pipestone County, Minnesota